Micrairoideae is a subfamily of the grass family Poaceae, distributed in tropical and subtropical regions. Within the PACMAD clade, it is sister to subfamily Arundinoideae.

It includes roughly 190 species in nine genera. A phylogenetic classification of the grasses recognises four main lineages, classified as tribes. Only species in tribe Eriachneae (genera Eriachne and Pheidochloa) have evolved the C4 photosynthetic pathway.

Phylogeny
Relationships of tribes in the Micrairoideae according to a 2017 phylogenetic classification, also showing the Arundinoideae as sister group:

References 

 
Poaceae subfamilies